Julius Ansel (born April 27, 1908, in Russia, died March 13, 1965, in Boston) was an American politician who was a member of the Boston City Council from 1948 to 1951, the Massachusetts House of Representatives from 1953 to 1955 and again from 1959 to 1965, and the Massachusetts Senate in 1965. He was an unsuccessful candidate for Mayor of Boston in 1963.

See also
 1953–1954 Massachusetts legislature
 1959–1960 Massachusetts legislature

References

1908 births
1965 deaths
Democratic Party Massachusetts state senators
Democratic Party members of the Massachusetts House of Representatives
Boston City Council members
Place of birth missing
20th-century American politicians
Emigrants from the Russian Empire to the United States